The La Tène culture was a European Iron Age culture. It developed and flourished during the late Iron Age (from about 450 BC to the Roman conquest in the 1st century BC), succeeding the early Iron Age Hallstatt culture without any definite cultural break, under considerable Mediterranean influence from the Greeks in pre-Roman Gaul, the Etruscans, and the Golasecca culture, but whose artistic style nevertheless did not depend on those Mediterranean influences.

La Tène culture's territorial extent corresponded to what is now France, Belgium, Switzerland, Austria, England, Southern Germany, the Czech Republic, Northern Italy and Central Italy, Slovenia, Hungary and Liechtenstein, as well as adjacent parts of the Netherlands, Slovakia, Serbia, Croatia, Transylvania (western Romania), and Transcarpathia (western Ukraine). The Celtiberians of western Iberia shared many aspects of the culture, though not generally the artistic style. To the north extended the contemporary Pre-Roman Iron Age of Northern Europe, including the Jastorf culture of Northern Germany and Denmark and all the way to Galatia in Asia Minor (today Turkey).

Centered on ancient Gaul, the culture became very widespread, and encompasses a wide variety of local differences. It is often distinguished from earlier and neighbouring cultures mainly by the La Tène style of Celtic art, characterized by curving "swirly" decoration, especially of metalwork.

It is named after the type site of La Tène on the north side of Lake Neuchâtel in Switzerland, where thousands of objects had been deposited in the lake, as was discovered after the water level dropped in 1857. La Tène is the type site and the term archaeologists use for the later period of the culture and art of the ancient Celts, a term that is firmly entrenched in the popular understanding, but presents numerous problems for historians and archaeologists.

Periodization

Extensive contacts through trade are recognized in foreign objects deposited in elite burials; stylistic influences on La Tène material culture can be recognized in Etruscan, Italic, Greek, Dacian and Scythian sources. Date-able Greek pottery and analysis employing scientific techniques such as dendrochronology and thermoluminescence help provide date ranges for an absolute chronology at some La Tène sites.

La Tène history was originally divided into "early", "middle" and "late" stages based on the typology of the metal finds (Otto Tischler 1885), with the Roman occupation greatly disrupting the culture, although many elements remain in Gallo-Roman and Romano-British culture. A broad cultural unity was not paralleled by overarching social-political unifying structures, and the extent to which the material culture can be linguistically linked is debated. The art history of La Tène culture has various schemes of periodization.

The archaeological period is now mostly divided into four sub-periods, following Paul Reinecke.

History

The preceding final phase of the Hallstatt culture, HaD, c. 650–450 BC, was also widespread across Central Europe, and the transition over this area was gradual, being mainly detected through La Tène style elite artefacts, which first appear on the western edge of the old Hallstatt region.

Though there is no agreement on the precise region in which La Tène culture first developed, there is a broad consensus that the centre of the culture lay on the northwest edges of Hallstatt culture, north of the Alps, within the region between in the West the valleys of the Marne and Moselle, and the part of the Rhineland nearby. In the east the western end of the old Hallstatt core area in modern Bavaria, the Czech Republic, Austria and Switzerland formed a somewhat separate "eastern style Province" in the early La Tène, joining with the western area in Alsace. In 1994 a prototypical ensemble of elite grave sites of the early 5th century BCE was excavated at Glauberg in Hesse, northeast of Frankfurt-am-Main, in a region that had formerly been considered peripheral to the La Tène sphere. The site at La Tène itself was therefore near the southern edge of the original "core" area (as is also the case for the Hallstatt site for its core).

The establishment of a Greek colony, soon very successful, at Massalia (modern Marseilles) on the Mediterranean coast of France led to great trade with the Hallstatt areas up the Rhone and Saone river systems, and early La Tène elite burials like the Vix Grave in Burgundy contain imported luxury goods along with artifacts produced locally. Most areas were probably controlled by tribal chiefs living in hilltop forts, while the bulk of the population lived in small villages or farmsteads in the countryside.

By 500 BCE the Etruscans expanded to border Celts in north Italy, and trade across the Alps began to overhaul trade with the Greeks, and the Rhone route declined. Booming areas included the middle Rhine, with large iron ore deposits, the Marne and Champagne regions, and also Bohemia, although here trade with the Mediterranean area was much less important. Trading connections and wealth no doubt played a part in the origin of the La Tène style, though how large a part remains much discussed; specific Mediterranean-derived motifs are evident, but the new style does not depend on them.

Barry Cunliffe notes localization of La Tène culture during the 5th century BCE when there arose "two zones of power and innovation: a Marne – Moselle zone in the west with trading links to the Po Valley via the central Alpine passes and the Golasecca culture, and a Bohemian zone in the east with separate links to the Adriatic via the eastern Alpine routes and the Venetic culture".

From their homeland, La Tène culture expanded in the 4th century BCE to more of modern France, Germany, and Central Europe, and beyond to Hispania, northern and central Italy, the Balkans, and even as far as Asia Minor, in the course of several major migrations. La Tène style artefacts start to appear in Britain around the same time, and Ireland rather later. The style of "Insular La Tène" art is somewhat different and the artefacts are initially found in some parts of the islands but not others. Migratory movements seem at best only partly responsible for the diffusion of La Tène culture there, and perhaps other parts of Europe.

By about 400 BCE, the evidence for Mediterranean trade becomes sparse; this may be because the expanding Celtic populations began to migrate south and west, coming into violent conflict with the established populations, including the Etruscans and Romans. 
The settled life in much of the La Tène homelands also seems to have become much more unstable and prone to wars. In about 387 BCE, the Celts under Brennus defeated the Romans and then sacked Rome, establishing themselves as the most prominent threats to the Roman homeland, a status they would retain through a series of Roman-Gallic wars until Julius Caesar's final conquest of Gaul in 58-50 BCE. The Romans prevented the Celts from reaching very far south of Rome, but on the other side of the Adriatic Sea groups passed through the Balkans to reach Greece, where Delphi was attacked and sacked in 279 BCE, and Asia, where Galatia was established as a Celtic area of Anatolia. By this time, the La Tène style was spreading to the British Isles, though apparently without any significant movements in population.

After about 275 BCE, Roman expansion into the La Tène area began with the conquest of Gallia Cisalpina. The conquest of Gallia Celtica followed in 121 BCE and was complete with the Gallic Wars of the 50s BCE. Gaulish culture quickly assimilated to Roman culture, giving rise to the hybrid Gallo-Roman culture of Late Antiquity.

Ethnology

The bearers of the La Tène culture were the people known as Celts or Gauls to ancient ethnographers. Ancient Celtic culture had no written literature of its own, but rare examples of epigraphy in the Greek or Latin alphabets exist allowing the fragmentary reconstruction of Continental Celtic.

Current knowledge of this cultural area is derived from three sources comprising archaeological evidence, Greek and Latin literary records, and ethnographical evidence suggesting some La Tène artistic and cultural survivals in traditionally Celtic regions of far western Europe. 
Some of the societies that are archaeologically identified with La Tène material culture were identified by Greek and Roman authors from the 5th century onwards as Keltoi ("Celts") and Galli ("Gauls"). Herodotus (iv.49) correctly placed Keltoi at the source of the Ister/Danube, in the heartland of La Tène material culture: "The Ister flows right across Europe, rising in the country of the Celts".

Whether the usage of classical sources means that the whole of La Tène culture can be attributed to a unified Celtic people is difficult to assess; archaeologists have repeatedly concluded that language, material culture, and political affiliation do not necessarily run parallel. Frey (2004) notes that in the 5th century, "burial customs in the Celtic world were not uniform; rather, localised groups had their own beliefs, which, in consequence, also gave rise to distinct artistic expressions".

Material culture

La Tène metalwork in bronze, iron and gold, developing technologically out of Hallstatt culture, is stylistically characterized by inscribed and inlaid intricate spirals and interlace, on fine bronze vessels, helmets and shields, horse trappings and elite jewelry, especially the neck rings called torcs and elaborate clasps called fibulae. It is characterized by elegant, stylized curvilinear animal and vegetal forms, allied with the Hallstatt traditions of geometric patterning.

The Early Style of La Tène art and culture mainly featured static, geometric decoration, while the transition to the Developed Style constituted a shift to movement-based forms, such as triskeles. Some subsets within the Developed Style contain more specific design trends, such as the recurrent serpentine scroll of the Waldalgesheim Style.

Initially La Tène people lived in open settlements that were dominated by the chieftains' hill forts. The development of towns—oppida—appears in mid-La Tène culture. La Tène dwellings were carpenter-built rather than of masonry. La Tène peoples also dug ritual shafts, in which votive offerings and even human sacrifices were cast. Severed heads appear to have held great power and were often represented in carvings. Burial sites included weapons, carts, and both elite and household goods, evoking a strong continuity with an afterlife.

Elaborate burials also reveal a wide network of trade. In Vix, France, an elite woman of the 6th century BCE was buried with a very large bronze "wine-mixer" made in Greece. Exports from La Tène cultural areas to the Mediterranean cultures were based on salt, tin, copper, amber, wool, leather, furs and gold. 
Artefacts typical of the La Tène culture were also discovered in stray finds as far afield as Scandinavia, Northern Germany, Poland and in the Balkans. It is therefore common to also talk of the "La Tène period" in the context of those regions even though they were never part of the La Tène culture proper, but connected to its core area via trade.

Type site

The La Tène type site is on the northern shore of Lake Neuchâtel, Switzerland, where the small river Thielle, connecting to another lake, enters the Lake Neuchâtel. In 1857, prolonged drought lowered the waters of the lake by about 2 m. 
On the northernmost tip of the lake, between the river and a point south of the village of Epagnier, Hansli Kopp, looking for antiquities for Colonel Frédéric Schwab, discovered several rows of wooden piles that still reached up about 50 cm into the water. From among these, Kopp collected about forty iron swords.

The Swiss archaeologist Ferdinand Keller published his findings in 1868 in his influential first report on the Swiss pile dwellings (Pfahlbaubericht). In 1863 he interpreted the remains as a Celtic village built on piles. Eduard Desor, a geologist from Neuchâtel, started excavations on the lakeshore soon afterwards. He interpreted the site as an armory, erected on platforms on piles over the lake and later destroyed by enemy action. Another interpretation accounting for the presence of cast iron swords that had not been sharpened, was of a site for ritual depositions.

With the first systematic lowering of the Swiss lakes from 1868 to 1883, the site fell completely dry. In 1880, Emile Vouga, a teacher from Marin-Epagnier, uncovered the wooden remains of two bridges (designated "Pont Desor" and "Pont Vouga") originally over 100 m long, that crossed the little Thielle River (today a nature reserve) and the remains of five houses on the shore. After Vouga had finished, F. Borel, curator of the Marin museum, began to excavate as well. In 1885 the canton asked the Société d'Histoire of Neuchâtel to continue the excavations, the results of which were published by Vouga in the same year.

All in all, over 2500 objects, mainly made from metal, have been excavated in La Tène. Weapons predominate, there being 166 swords (most without traces of wear), 270 lanceheads, and 22 shield bosses, along with 385 brooches, tools, and parts of chariots. Numerous human and animal bones were found as well. The site was used from the 3rd century, with a peak of activity around 200 BCE and abandonment by about 60 BCE. Interpretations of the site vary. Some scholars believe the bridge was destroyed by high water, while others see it as a place of sacrifice after a successful battle (there are almost no female ornaments).

An exhibition marking the 150th anniversary of the discovery of the La Tène site opened in 2007 at the Musée Schwab in Biel/Bienne, Switzerland, moving to move to Zürich in 2008 and Mont Beuvray in Burgundy in 2009.

Sites

Some sites are:

Gallery

Artifacts
See :Category:Celtic art.

Some outstanding La Tène artifacts are:
Mšecké Žehrovice Head, a stone head from the modern Czech Republic 
A life-sized sculpture of a warrior that stood above the Glauberg burials
Chariot burial found at La Gorge Meillet (St-Germain-en-Laye: Musée des Antiquités Nationales)
Basse Yutz Flagons 5th century
Agris Helmet, with gold covering, c. 350
Waldalgesheim chariot burial, Bad Kreuznach, Germany, late 4th century BCE, Rheinisches Landesmuseum Bonn; the "Waldalgesheim phase/style" of the art takes its name from the jewellery found here.

A gold-and-bronze model of an oak tree (3rd century BCE) found at the Oppidum of Manching.
Sculptures from Roquepertuse, a sanctuary in the south of France
The silver Gundestrup cauldron (2nd or 1st century BCE), found ritually broken in a peat bog near Gundestrup, Denmark, but probably made near the Black Sea, perhaps in Thrace. (National Museum of Denmark, Copenhagen)
Battersea Shield (350–50 BCE), found in London in the Thames, made of bronze with red enamel. (British Museum, London)
Waterloo Helmet, 150-50 BCE, Thames
"Witham Shield" (4th century BCE). (British Museum, London) 
Torrs Pony-cap and Horns, from Scotland
Cordoba Treasure
Turoe stone in Galway and Killycluggin Stone in Cavan Ireland
Great Torc from Snettisham, 100-75 BCE, gold, the most elaborate of the British style of torcs  
Meyrick Helmet, post-conquest Roman helmet shape, with La Tène decoration
Noric steel

Genetics

A genetic study published in PLOS One in December 2018 examined 45 individuals buried at a La Tène necropolis in Urville-Nacqueville, France. The people buried there were identified as Gauls. The mtDNA of the examined individuals belonged primarily to haplotypes of H and U. They were found to be carrying a large amount of steppe ancestry, and to have been closely related to peoples of the preceding Bell Beaker culture, suggesting genetic continuity between Bronze Age and Iron Age France. Significant gene flow with Great Britain and Iberia was detected. The results of the study partially supported the notion that French people are largely descended from the Gauls.

A genetic study published in the Journal of Archaeological Science in October 2019 examined 43 maternal and 17 paternal lineages for the La Tène necropolis in Urville-Nacqueville, France, and 27 maternal and 19 paternal lineages for La Tène tumulus of Gurgy Les Noisats near modern Paris, France. The examined individuals displayed strong genetic resemblance to peoples of the earlier Yamnaya culture, Corded Ware culture and Bell Beaker culture. They carried a diverse set of maternal lineages associated with steppe ancestry. The paternal lineages were on the other hand characterized by a "striking homogeneity", belonging entirely to haplogroup R and R1b, both of whom are associated with steppe ancestry. The evidence suggested that the Gauls of the La Tène culture were patrilineal and patrilocal, which is in agreement with archaeological and literary evidence.

A genetic study published in the Proceedings of the National Academy of Sciences of the United States of America in June 2020 examined the remains of 25 individuals ascribed to the La Tène culture. The nine examples of individual Y-DNA extracted were determined to belong to either the paragroups or subclades of haplogroups R1b1a1a2 (R-M269; three examples), R1b1a1a2a1a2c1a1a1a1a1 (R-M222), R1b1 (R-L278), R1b1a1a (R-P297), I1 (I-M253),  E1b1b (E-M215), or other, unspecified, subclades of haplogroup R. The 25 samples of mtDNA extracted was determined to belong to various subclades of haplogroup H, HV, U, K, J, V and W. The examined individuals of the Hallstatt culture and La Tène culture were genetically highly homogeneous and displayed continuity with the earlier Bell Beaker culture. They carried about 50% steppe-related ancestry.

A genetic study published in iScience in April 2022 examined 49 genomes from 27 sites in Bronze Age and Iron Age France. The study found evidence of strong genetic continuity between the two periods, particularly in southern France. The samples from northern and southern France were highly homogeneous, with northern samples displaying links to contemporary samples form Great Britain and Sweden, and southern samples displaying links to Celtiberians. The northern French samples were distinguished from the southern ones by elevated levels of steppe-related ancestry. R1b was by far the most dominant paternal lineage, while H was the most common maternal lineage. The Iron Age samples resembled those of modern-day populations of France, Great Britain and Spain. The evidence suggested that the Gauls of the La Tène culture largely evolved from local Bronze Age populations.

See also
Jublains archeological site

Notes

References

 

 
Garrow, Duncan (ed), Rethinking Celtic Art, 2008, Oxbow Books, 9781842173183, google books
Green, Miranda, Celtic Art, Reading the Messages, 1996, The Everyman Art Library, 
Laing, Lloyd and Jenifer. Art of the Celts, Thames and Hudson, London 1992 
McIntosh, Jane, Handbook to Life in Prehistoric Europe, 2009, Oxford University Press (USA), 
Megaw, Ruth and Vincent (2001). Celtic Art.

Further reading
 Cunliffe, Barry. The Ancient Celts. Oxford: Oxford University Press. 1997
 Collis, John. The Celts: Origins, Myths, Invention. London: Tempus, 2003.
 Kruta, Venceslas, La grande storia dei Celti. La nascita, l'affermazione, la decadenza, Newton & Compton, Roma, 2003  (492 pp. - a translation of Les Celtes, histoire et dictionnaire. Des origines à la romanisation et au christianisme, Robert Laffont, Paris, 2000, without the dictionary)
 James, Simon. The Atlantic Celts. London: British Museum Press, 1999.
 James, Simon & Rigby, Valery. Britain and the Celtic Iron Age. London: British Museum Press, 1997.
 Reginelli Servais Gianna and Béat Arnold, La Tène, un site, un mythe, Hauterive : Laténium - Parc et musée d'archéologie de Neuchâtel, 2007, Cahiers d'archéologie romande de la Bibliothèque historique vaudoise, 3 vols,

External links

 Charles Bergengren, Cleveland Institute of Art, 1999: illustrations of La Tène artifacts
 La Tène Archaeological Sites in Romania
 

 
Celtic archaeological cultures
Iron Age cultures of Europe
Archaeological cultures of Central Europe
Archaeological cultures of Southeastern Europe
Archaeological cultures of Southern Europe
Archaeological cultures of Southwestern Europe
Archaeological cultures of Western Europe
Archaeological cultures in Austria
Archaeological cultures in Belgium
Archaeological cultures in Bulgaria
Archaeological cultures in Croatia
Archaeological cultures in the Czech Republic
Archaeological cultures in England
Archaeological cultures in France
Archaeological cultures in Germany
Archaeological cultures in Hungary
Archaeological cultures in Ireland
Archaeological cultures in the Netherlands
Archaeological cultures in Portugal
Archaeological cultures in Romania
Archaeological cultures in Scotland
Archaeological cultures in Serbia
Archaeological cultures in Slovakia
Archaeological cultures in Slovenia
Archaeological cultures in Spain
Archaeological cultures in Switzerland
Archaeological cultures in Turkey